Torquigener florealis is a fish of the pufferfish family Tetraodontidae native to the Western Pacific Ocean.

References

Fish of China
Fish of the Pacific Ocean
Fish described in 1871
florealis